This is a chronological list of notable cases decided by the Supreme Court of Canada from the appointment of Bora Laskin in 1973 as Chief Justice to his death in office in 1984. Laskin was the first Chief Justice to hear cases under the Charter of Rights and Freedoms implemented in 1982.

19731974

19751979

19801984

See also
 List of Judicial Committee of the Privy Council cases
 List of notable Canadian Courts of Appeals cases

 (1973-1984)